The  is a foundation headquartered in the Suzuko Building (スズコービル Suzukō biru) in Nihonbashi, Chuo, Tokyo.

History
It was established in 1903 by former Prime Minister Shigenobu Ōkuma, Viscount Moriyoshi Nagaoka, Viscount Eiichi Shibusawa and others to encourage India-Japan friendship. The association has contributed to the improvement of India-Japan relations since the establishment.

In 1939, the association was authorized as a foundation by Ministry of Foreign Affairs. During WW2, the association supported the Indian independence movement. The war ended, the association was disbanded by Allied Forces for the reason of having supported the Indian independence movement. In 1947, India gained her Independence, the association restored activities by changing their name to Japan–India Economic Association.

In 1952, the year of regaining sovereignty, the association restored the association's name to Japan–India Association and expanded activities to different cultures.  The association's activities are expanded from year to year.

The current president is former Prime Minister Yoshirō Mori.

See also 
 India–Japan relations

References

External links 
 Japan-India Association

Japan friendship associations
India–Japan relations
1903 establishments in Japan
India friendship associations
Organizations based in Tokyo
Organizations established in 1903